Manangle Parish, Cumberland (also spelled Menangle) is one of the 57 parishes of Cumberland County, New South Wales, a cadastral unit for use on land titles. Its eastern boundary is the Georges River, and western boundary the Nepean River. It includes the southern Sydney suburbs of Menangle Park (including its railway station), Gilead, Rosemeadow and part of Glen Alpine. Major roads in the area include the South Western Freeway, Menangle Road and Appin Road.

References
 
 Parish of Manangle, County of Cumberland
 New South Wales Parish maps preservation project

Parishes of Cumberland County